Leptogomphus is a genus of dragonfly in the family Gomphidae. It contains the following species:
Leptogomphus baolocensis Karube, 2001
Leptogomphus celebratus Chao, 1982
Leptogomphus coomansi Laidlaw, 1936
Leptogomphus divaricatus Chao, 1984
Leptogomphus elegans Lieftinck 1948 
Leptogomphus gestroi Selys, 1891 
Leptogomphus hongkongensis Asahina, 1988
Leptogomphus inclitus Selys, 1878
Leptogomphus inouei Karube, 2014
Leptogomphus intermedius Chao, 1982
Leptogomphus lansbergei Selys, 1878
Leptogomphus mariae Lieftinck, 1948 
Leptogomphus palawanus Asahina, 1968 
Leptogomphus pasia van Tol, 1990
Leptogomphus pendleburyi Laidlaw, 1934
Leptogomphus perforatus Ris, 1912
Leptogomphus risi Laidlaw, 1932
Leptogomphus sauteri Ris, 1912
Leptogomphus semperi Selys, 1878 
Leptogomphus tamdaoensis Karube, 2014 
Leptogomphus uenoi Asahina, 1996
Leptogomphus unicornus Needham, 1930
Leptogomphus williamsoni Laidlaw, 1912 
Leptogomphus yayeyamensis Matsumura in Oguma, 1926

References 

Gomphidae
Anisoptera genera
Taxonomy articles created by Polbot